Pundamilia is a small genus of haplochromine cichlids endemic to East Africa, primarily in Lake Victoria. FishBase includes them in Haplochromis. The generic epithet comes from Swahili punda milia ("zebra") after their striped appearance.

At present, five species are placed here:

 Pundamilia azurea Seehausen and Lippisch, 1998
 Pundamilia igneopinis Seehausen & Lippitsch 1998
 Pundamilia macrocephala Seehausen & Bouton 1998
 Pundamilia nyererei (Witte-Maas & F. Witte, 1985)
 Pundamilia pundamilia Seehausen & Bouton 1998

References

 

Cichlid genera
Taxonomy articles created by Polbot